Emir Sulejmanović (born July 13, 1995) is a Bosnian professional basketball player for Bilbao of the Spanish Liga ACB.

Professional career

Club career
Sulejmanović was born in Srebrenica, Bosnia and Herzegovina, but migrated with his family to Jyväskylä, Finland in 1997. The family finally settled in Kaarina in 2000, where Sulejmanović grew up playing junior basketball for the Kaarina Ura team. In 2011 he transferred to the junior academy of KK Union Olimpija, signing a four-year contract as he made the full squad one year later. He participated in the EuroLeague for the first time against Real Madrid Baloncesto in December 2012.

In July 2013, Sulejmanović moved to FC Barcelona Bàsquet. During the next two years he mostly played with the FC Barcelona B reserve squad. In April 2015, he was loaned to Italian team Orlandina Basket for the rest of the season.

On August 4, 2016, Sulejmanović signed with Croatian club Cibona.

On August 14, 2017, Sulejmanović signed a two-year deal with Spanish club Fuenlabrada. On October 11, 2017, he was loaned to Cafés Candelas Breogán of the LEB Oro. On July 18, 2018, he was loaned to Cafés Candelas Breogán. On August 16, 2019, Sulejmanović signed a two-year deal with Spanish club RETAbet Bilbao Basket. He averaged 6 points and 5 rebounds per game. On July 12, 2020, he parted ways with the team. Sulejmanović signed with CB 1939 Canarias on July 14.

On July 20, 2022, he has signed with Bilbao of the Spanish Liga ACB.

International career
Sulejmanović has played for the Finnish U-16 and U-20 junior national teams in the past. He has however announced that he will represent Bosnia and Herzegovina national basketball team in future senior international tournaments.

References

External links 
Euroleague profile
Finnish basketball association profile (in Finnish)
Spanish Basketball Federation profile (in Spanish)

1995 births
Living people
ABA League players
Baloncesto Fuenlabrada players
Bilbao Basket players
Bosnia and Herzegovina emigrants to Finland
Bosnia and Herzegovina expatriate basketball people in Spain
Bosnia and Herzegovina men's basketball players
Bosnia and Herzegovina Muslims
Bosniaks of Bosnia and Herzegovina
CB Breogán players
CB Canarias players
FC Barcelona Bàsquet players
Finnish expatriate basketball people in Spain
Finnish men's basketball players
Finnish people of Bosnia and Herzegovina descent
KK Cibona players
KK Olimpija players
Lega Basket Serie A players
Liga ACB players
Orlandina Basket players
People from Rogatica
Power forwards (basketball)
Yugoslav Wars refugees